Thorburn Airport  is located  west of Thorburn, Nova Scotia, Canada.

References

Registered aerodromes in Nova Scotia